William Irving may refer to:

 William Irving (British politician) (1892–1967), British Labour Co-operative MP 1945–1955
 William Irving (steamship captain) (1816–1872), steamship captain from Scotland, active in Oregon, Washington and British Columbia
 William Irving (American politician) (1766–1821), United States Representative from New York
 William Irving (actor) (1893–1943), American actor
William Irving (architect) (1830–1883), a Canadian architect known for his late 19th century buildings in Toronto

See also
William Irvine (disambiguation)
William Irwin (disambiguation)
William Irvin (disambiguation)
William Irving Shuman, American businessman and politician